Gytte Minton (29 April 1901 – 11 July 1964) was a British fencer. She competed in the women's individual foil event at the 1948 Summer Olympics.

References

1901 births
1964 deaths
British female fencers
Olympic fencers of Great Britain
Fencers at the 1948 Summer Olympics
Sportspeople from Copenhagen